Santa Cruz-Trindade e Sanjurge is a civil parish in the municipality of Chaves, Portugal. It was formed in 2013 by the merger of the former parishes Santa Cruz-Trindade and Sanjurge. The population in 2011 was 3,430, in an area of 13.38 km2.

Architecture
 Chapel of Nossa Senhora do Rosário
 Chapel of São Miguel
 Church of Sagrada Família
 Church of Santa Clara
 Cross of Sanjurge

References

Freguesias of Chaves, Portugal